The Harassment Consultation Centre for Women in Politics (Japanese: 女性議員のハラスメント相談センター) is a Japanese website created to support women politicians running for office.

The website is Japan's first web-based platform that enables aspiring female politicians to collaborate against gender discrimination.

The website is run by volunteers, including politician 濵田真里共同 and Mari Hamada.

See also 
 Satoko Kishimoto

References 

2023 establishments in Japan
Japanese websites
Women's rights in Japan